is a stable of sumo wrestlers, one of the Dewanoumi group of stables. It broke off from Sakaigawa stable by its founder, former ōzeki Gōeidō Gōtarō, and officially opened in February 2022. In May 2022 Nishikawa (now Gōnoyama) became the first member of the stable to be promoted to the jūryō division. As of Januaray 2023, the stable had six wrestlers.

Ring name conventions
Some wrestlers at this stable take ring names or shikona that begin with the character 豪 (read: gō), in deference to the coach and stable's owner, former Gōeidō.

Owners
2021-present: 14th Takekuma Gōtarō (iin, ōzeki Gōeidō)

Notable active wrestlers

 (best rank jūryō)

Usher
Kumajiro (jonokuchi yobidashi, real name Raiku Matsumoto)

Location and access
The stable is planned to be built in Yukigayaōtsuka-chō, Ōta, Tokyo.

See also
 Heya
 Japan Sumo Association
 List of active sumo wrestlers
 List of past sumo wrestlers
 List of sumo stables
 List of sumo elders
 List of ōzeki
 Toshiyori

References

External links
Takekuma stable page at Japan Sumo Association
Official Site (in Japanese)

Active sumo stables